Joxe Azurmendi Otaegi (born 19 March 1941) is a Basque writer, philosopher, essayist and poet. He has published numerous articles and books on ethics, politics, the philosophy of language, technique, Basque literature and philosophy in general.

He is member of Jakin and the director of Jakin irakurgaiak, a publishing house which has published over 40 books under his management. He also collaborated with the Klasikoak publishing firm in the Basque translations of various philosophical works and was one of the founders of Udako Euskal Unibertsitatea (The Basque Summer University). He is currently a Professor of Modern Philosophy and a lecturer at Euskal Herriko Unibertsitatea (The University of the Basque Country). In 2010 he was awarded the title "honorary academic" by Euskaltzaindia (The Basque Language Academy).

Azurmendi is an intellectual who studies the problem more than the solution. Azurmendi's essays cover modern European topics in great depth and knowledge. He has incorporated the philosophy and thinking of European thinkers, especially German ones. He often adopts a polemic tone.

Joxe Azurmendi is, in the opinion of many, one of the most prolific and erudite thinkers in the Basque Country.

Life
Joxe Azurmendi studied philosophy and theology at The University of the Basque Country, Rome and Münster.

At the beginning of the 1960s he joined the cultural movement which grew up around the magazine Jakin, and was in fact the director of the publication when it was prohibited for the first time by Franco's regime. He has collaborated closely and uninterruptedly with the magazine since its restoration. In that publication he has raised the problems of Basque society in the context of European thinkers. During the early 1970s he focused his attention on disseminating basic literature in the Basque language on subjects which were being hotly debated at the time in the Basque Country: nationhood, socialism, internationalism, etc. In the 1980s he began teaching at The University of the Basque Country, and in 1984 he submitted his thesis on Jose Maria Arizmendiarrieta, the founder of the Mondragon cooperative movement, in which he argued that Arizmendiarrieta's project aimed to unite individuals and society under an organisation which combined both socialism and French personalism.

In 1992 he published what was to become his best-known work: Espainolak eta euskaldunak (The Spanish and the Basques). The work, published by Elkar, was written in response to a text by Sánchez-Albornoz which claimed that "The Basques are the last people to be civilised in Spain; they have a thousand years less civilisation than any other people ... They are rough, simple people who nevertheless consider themselves to be the children of God and the heirs to his glory. But they are really nothing more than un-Romanised Spaniards." Azurmendi's essay refuted and dismantled the stereotypes maintained about the Basques by certain Spanish intellectuals.

It was on the threshold of the new millennium, however, that Azurmendi's work reached its height. During the early years of the 21st century he published the trilogy formed by Espainiaren arimaz (About the soul of Spain) (2006, Elkar), Humboldt. Hizkuntza eta pentsamendua (Humboldt. Language and Thought) (2007, UEU) and Volksgeist. Herri gogoa (Volksgeist. National Character) (2008, Elkar). In this trilogy, Joxe Azurmendi reveals some of his most significant thinking.

Philosophical work
His work emerged and developed during a period marked by a crisis of culture, politics and values. But it was a crisis that he understood not as something negative, but rather something that opened up a whole new range of possibilities. Consequently, all his thinking is centred around the defence of freedom in every field, but especially in relation to conscience and thinking.

Far from fleeing the crisis, then, his work tries to outline how we can live in this situation. To this end, he adopts a relativist perspective, and given that modernity has left us with no solid base, he fights against the last vestiges of the dogmatism towards which our society tends to lean when in crisis:

In this sense, for example, he is critical of the modern state, which he accuses of being the new church seeking to control our consciences. He also criticises the exploitation of morality, or in other words, how politicians, instead of solving the problems facing them in their various areas or fields, flee instead to moral ground to hide their responsibilities under the cloak of supposedly absolute moral principles:

He has also made an important contribution in questioning the canonical interpretations which have been constructed regarding different issues. Of particular interest, due to his erudition and training in Germany, is his interpretation of the German Enlightenment. In this context he deconstructs the apparent opposition between the French Enlightenment and German Romanticism and proposes a new way of thinking about the different aspects which stem from this opposition. In this way, he defies certain Spanish and French intellectuals (Alain Finkielkraut) and argues that nationalism in fact arose in France (Montesquieu, Voltaire, Rousseau, Ernest Renan) and was later reinterpreted by the German thinkers and romantics. By doing this, he questions the way in which authors such as Goethe, Schiller, Herder or Humboldt are viewed as the fathers of metaphysical nationalism. In this field, the opposition between civic nationalism and ethnic nationalism is deconstructed. Thus, Azurmendi criticizes the essentialist basis of Spanish nationalism and French nationalism that operates under these nation states.

Some of the topics Azurmendi deeply develops in his essays first appeared in his poetry of youth. Azurmendi is within the Basque poetry of the 60s which shows the fight against the tradition, the old faith and the dogmatic certainties:

But we wish to be free
is that my fault?
They tried to give us a tree from Gernika,
a false blank check,
as if the desire to be free were a sin,
but despite that, we, quite simply, wish to be free.
That is what we want, that is all.
This is the latest deception:
they have led us to believe
before from outside and now from within
that it is our responsibility to justify our wish to be free.

Manifestu atzeratua (Belated Manifesto) (1968)

He also dedicates a large part of his work to recovering and reinterpreting Basque thinkers, breaking through and dismantling numerous stereotypes. Of particular interest is his research into Jon Mirande, Orixe, Unamuno and others. He is an author who has worked from within and for Basque culture. He claims to have been influenced by Basque authors from the post-war period, for example, in questions of language. In this field, he has researched other authors also, including Heidegger, Wittgenstein, George Steiner and Humboldt. The fact that his vast oeuvre is all written in the Basque language is clearly consistent with his thinking.

Writing style
In his language Joxe Azurmendi combines an educated register with colloquial expressions, and his prose is fast, incisive, and ironic. Azurmendi's Basque is modern and standard and he demonstrates great knowledge of the language, and richness and variety of expression.

Awards and recognition
 1976: Andima Ibiñagabeitia Award for the work: Espainolak eta euskaldunak
 1978: Irun Hiria Award for the work: Mirande eta kristautasuna (Mirande and Christianity).
 1998: Irun Hiria Award for the work: Teknikaren meditazioa (Meditations on Technique).
 2005: Juan San Martin Award for the work: Humboldt: Hizkuntza eta pentsamendua (Humboldt. Language and Thought).
 2010: Euskadi Literatura Saria Award, in the essay category, for the work: Azken egunak Gandiagarekin (The last days with Gandiaga).
 2010: Ohorezko euskaltzaina by Euskaltzaindia.
 2012: Eusko Ikaskuntza Award. 
 2012: Dabilen Elea Award
 2014: Digitization of the entire work of Joxe Azurmendi by The Council of Gipuzkoa
 2015: Euskadi Literatura Saria Award, in the essay category, for the work: Historia, arraza, nazioa (History, race, nation).
 2019: Joxe Azurmendi Congress hosted by Joxe Azurmendi Katedra and University of the Basque Country

Works
The Inguma database of the Basque scientific community contains over 180 texts written by Azurmendi.

Essays
 Hizkuntza, etnia eta marxismoa (Language, Ethnics and Marxism) (1971, Euskal Elkargoa)
 Kolakowski (Kołakowski) (1972, EFA): co-author: Joseba Arregui
 Kultura proletarioaz (About Proletarian Culture) (1973, Jakin EFA)
 Iraultza sobietarra eta literatura (The Soviet Revolution and Literature) (1975, Gero Mensajero)
 Gizona Abere hutsa da (Man is Pure Animal) (1975, EFA)
 Zer dugu Orixeren kontra? (What do we have against Orixe?) (1976, EFA Jakin)
 Zer dugu Orixeren alde? (What do we have in favour of Orixe?) (1977, EFA Jakin)
 Artea eta gizartea (Art and Society) (1978, Haranburu)
 Errealismo sozialistaz (About Socialist Realism) (1978, Haranburu)
 Mirande eta kristautasuna (Mirande and Christianity) (1978, GAK)
 Arana Goiriren pentsamendu politikoa (The political thinking of Arana Goiri) (1979, Hordago Lur)
 Nazionalismo Internazionalismo Euskadin (Nationalism Internationalism in the Basque Country) (1979, Hordago Lur)
 PSOE eta euskal abertzaletasuna (The Spanish Socialist Party and Basque Nationalism) (1979, Hordago Lur)
 El hombre cooperativo. Pensamiento de Arizmendiarrieta (Cooperative Man. Arizmendiarrieta's thinking) (1984, Lan Kide Aurrezkia)
 Translated into Japanese as ホセ・アスルメンディ: アリスメンディアリエタの協同組合哲学 ( 東大和 : みんけん出版 , 1990) 
 Filosofía personalista y cooperación. Filosofía de Arizmendiarrieta (Personalist philosophy and cooperation. Arizmendiarrieta's philosophy) (1984, EHU)
 Schopenhauer, Nietzsche, Spengler, Miranderen pentsamenduan (Schopenhauer, Nietzsche, Spengler in the thinking of Mirande) (1989, Susa)
 Miranderen pentsamendua (Mirande's thinking) (1989, Susa)
 Gizaberearen bakeak eta gerrak (War and Peace according to the Human Animal) (1991, Elkar)
 Espainolak eta euskaldunak (The Spanish and the Basques) (1992, Elkar)
 Translated into Spanish as Azurmendi, Joxe: Los españoles y los euskaldunes, Hondarribia: Hiru, 1995. 
 Karlos Santamaria. Ideiak eta ekintzak (Karlos Santamaria. Ideas and Action) (1994, The Gipuzkoa Provincial Council (unpublished))
 La idea cooperativa: del servicio a la comunidad a su nueva creación (The cooperative idea: from the community service toward its new creation) (1996, Gizabidea Fundazioa)
 Demokratak eta biolentoak (The Democrats and the Violent) (1997, Elkar)
 Teknikaren meditazioa (Meditations on Technique) (1998, Kutxa Fundazioa)
 Oraingo gazte eroak (The Mad Youth of Today) (1998)
 El hecho catalán. El hecho portugués (The Catalan fact. The Portuguese fact) (1999, Hiru)
 Euskal Herria krisian (The Basque Country in Crisis) (1999, Elkar)
 La violencia y la búsqueda de nuevos valores (The violence and the search for new values) (2001, Hiru)
 La presencia de Nietzsche en los pensadores vascos Ramiro de Maeztu y Jon Mirande (The Nietzsche's presence in the Basque thinkers Ramiro de Maeztu and Jon Mirande) (2002, Euskalerriaren Adiskideen Elkartea)
 Etienne Salaberry. Bere pentsamenduaz (1903–2003) (Etienne Salaberry. About his Thinking (1903–2003)) (2003, Egan)
 Espainiaren arimaz (About the soul of Spain) (2006, Elkar)
 Volksgeist. Herri gogoa (Volksgeist. National Character) (2007, Elkar)
 Humboldt. Hizkuntza eta pentsamendua (Humboldt. Language and Thought) (2007, UEU)
 Azken egunak Gandiagarekin (The last days with Gandiaga) (2009, Elkar)
 Bakea gudan (Peace in War) (2012, Txalaparta)
 Barkamena, kondena, tortura (Forgiveness, Condemnation, Torture) (2012, Elkar)
 Karlos Santamariaren pentsamendua (Karlos Santamaria's thinking) (2013, Jakin/EHU)
 Historia, arraza, nazioa (History, race, nation) (2014, Elkar)
 Gizabere kooperatiboaz (About the cooperative Human Animal) (2016, Jakin)
 Hizkuntza, Nazioa, Estatua (Language, Nation, State) (2017, Elkar)
 Beltzak, juduak eta beste euskaldun batzuk (Blacks, Jews and other Basques) (2018, Elkar)
 Pentsamenduaren historia Euskal Herrian (History of thought in the Basque Country) (2020, EHU-Jakin)

Poetry
 Hitz berdeak (Unrefined words) (1971, EFA)
 XX. mendeko poesia kaierak – Joxe Azurmendi (Books of 20th century poetry – Joxe Azurmendi) (2000, Susa), edition of Koldo Izagirre.

Articles in journals
 Articles in the journal Jakin
 Articles in the journal Anaitasuna
 Articles in the journal RIEV

See also
 Volksgeist

References

Citations

Sources 

 Aizpuru, A. (coord.) 2012: Euskal Herriko pentsamenduaren gida, Bilbo: UEU .
 Aizpuru, A. 2013: Suak erreko ez balu (I), hAUSnART, 3:102–121.
 Altzibar, X. 2011: "XX. mendeko euskal literatura: saiakera" in Mari Jose Olaziregi, Euskal literaturaren historia, Donostia: EIZEI . English edition: Olaziregi, Mari Jose (2012). Basque Literary History, Reno: Center for Basque Studies/University of Nevada.  (pbk.).
 Arrieta, A. 2013: "Eranskina: Joxe Azurmendiren Azken egunak Gandiagarekin" in Arimak eta balioak, Donostia: Jakin. .
 Azurmendi, Haritz 2019: Joxe Azurmendiren nazioa Nazionalismo Ikerketen argitan. Abertzaletasun kulturalaren defentsa Euskal Herri garaikidean, Doctoral thesis, EHU.
 del Olmo, K. 2013: "Joxe Azurmendi: Espainolak eta euskaldunak (1992)" in Egungo euskal saiakeraren historia, Bilbo: EHU. .
 Olariaga, A. 2019: Erlatibismoaren egiak, Bilbo, UEU. .
 Hegats. Literatur aldizkaria (45). ISSN 1130-2445.
 Jakin. 237 (2020) ISSN O211/495X. (Monographic issue on Joxe Azurmendi Congress)
 Sudupe, P. 2011: 50eko Hamarkadako Euskal Literatura II, Donostia: Utriusque Vasconiae .

External links

  The democrats and the violent
  Verspätetes Manifest
  Ein Denkmal der Achtung und Liebe. Humboldt über die baskische Landschaft, RIEV, 48-1: 125–142, Eusko Ikaskuntza, 2003 ISSN 0212-7016 
  Joxe Azurmendi on the jakingunea website
  section on Joxe Azurmendi on the Literaturaren Zubitegia website
  The poem Prometeo mixerablea, music by Imanol Ubeda.
  interview by Elkarri.
  Karlos Santamaria's thinking.
  Schopenhauer, Nietzsche, Spengler, in the thinking of Mirande (1989, Susa)
  Books of 20th century poetry – Joxe Azurmendi (2000, Susa)
  Joxe Azurmendi on the Lapiko Kritikoa website. 

1941 births
20th-century essayists
20th-century Spanish philosophers
21st-century essayists
21st-century Spanish philosophers
Basque philosophers
Basque-language poets
Basque writers
Continental philosophers
Irony theorists
Literary critics of Basque
Living people
Philosophers of culture
Philosophers of language
Philosophers of literature
Philosophers of religion
Philosophers of technology
Philosophy academics
Philosophy writers
Political philosophers
Scholars of modern philosophy
Scholars of nationalism
Scholars of Marxism
Social commentators
Social philosophers
Spanish essayists
Spanish ethicists
Spanish male non-fiction writers
Theorists on Western civilization
University of Münster alumni
University of the Basque Country alumni
Academic staff of the University of the Basque Country